Steal This Album! is the third studio album by American heavy metal band System of a Down, released on November 26, 2002, by American Recordings and Columbia Records. Produced by Rick Rubin and Daron Malakian, it peaked at number 15 on the US Billboard 200.

Background 
In early 2002, medium-quality MP3s of the album were released on the internet under the name Toxicity II. The band issued a statement expressing disappointment that fans were hearing material that was unfinished, and they worked to release a completed, better quality version of the album, which became Steal This Album!.

Though often reported in the media as being a collection of B-sides and outtakes, the band insisted that the Steal This Album! material is of the same quality as the tracks which made it onto Toxicity. Vocalist Serj Tankian has said that the songs were left out of Toxicity "because they did not fit the overall continuity of the album". In May 2009, drummer John Dolmayan revealed that the album is his favorite System of a Down release. Similarly, Tankian also called the album his favorite System of a Down album in a 2012 AMA on reddit.

A first version of "Streamline" was used in The Scorpion King soundtrack, which was released in early 2002, and as a B-side on the CD2 edition of "Aerials".

Multi-instrumentalist Arto Tunçboyacıyan sings on the song "Bubbles", making his third appearance with System of a Down (having appeared on two songs on Toxicity).

Commenting on the track "I-E-A-I-A-I-O", drummer John Dolmayan said it was inspired by an encounter he had with Knight Rider actor David Hasselhoff in a liquor store in Los Angeles when he was around 12:

Critical reception

The album received generally favorable reviews from music critics scoring 77 out of 100 on aggregate website Metacritic. Giving the album 4 stars out of 5 in his review for AllMusic Chris True noted "If System proved anything with 2001's Toxicity, it's that they're one of the few breaths of fresh air out there in mainstream metal land. This collection is no different, and with its amazing pacing, it's hard to not be moved by what this band can do". "Steal This Album stands head-and-tattooed shoulders above its competition in the hard-rock genre" said Entertainment Weekly in a mutually glowing review, awarding the album a B+ rating.

Rolling Stone called Steal This Album "An absurdist blast of political rage, silly theater and shattered math metal." Jeremy Gladstone of Kludge gave the album a score of 7 out of 10 in his review and both praised and criticized the album writing "Love them or hate them, System is here to stay. The writing is consistent and the music is as tight as we have been accustomed to, perhaps a degree more so at times on the album. Steal This Album is guaranteed to satisfy every System of a Down fan listening. However, from song eight to twelve on the album, the material is a little too similar to really stand out compared to the more intense tracks. Unreleased material can sometimes be good, and sometimes it still doesn't work out".

Victoria Segal, writing for NME, gave Steal This Album! 3.5 stars out of 5 in a less flattering review, stating "System Of A Down's concerns may be no laughing matter, but unfortunately, their music often is. Guitarist Daron Malakian describes this record as 'a bridge between Toxicity and our next record,' which only indicates troubled waters ahead". She did however end her review with "Yes, System Of A Down are insane, ridiculous, a brain-pan pizza with extra mushrooms. But how can something this righteous ever be wrong?"

Alternative artwork 
There are four limited-edition alternate CD designs, each designed and drawn by a member of the band. Tankian's is blue with a poem in white spiraling into its center, Odadjian's is red with psychedelic flames, Dolmayan's is black with a gray skull incorporating the album's title into its teeth, and Malakian's is white with the legs of a man (in jeans) and woman (in red stockings). The vinyl edition of the album was released as a double picture disc with each side featuring one of these designs.

In Europe and the UK the standard version includes a one-sided front insert, the reason for this being that most CDs in the UK are not sold sealed so it might appear that the cover had been stolen had it been shipped without it. It is all white with the album title in black, similar to the original CD cover. The insert contains minimal information and contains a link to the official website for more track information.

Track listing
All lyrics written by Serj Tankian, except where noted.  All music written by Daron Malakian, except where noted.

Personnel
System of a Down
 Serj Tankian – vocals, keyboards
 Daron Malakian – guitars, vocals
 Shavo Odadjian – bass
 John Dolmayan – drums

Additional musicians
 Arto Tunçboyaciyan – vocals and percussions on "Bubbles"
 Greg Collins – theremin on "Ego Brain"

Production
 Produced by Rick Rubin and Daron Malakian
 Recorded by David Schiffman, Thom Russo
 Mixed by Andy Wallace
 "Roulette" mixed by Rick Rubin, Thom Russo and David Schiffman
 Mastered by Vlado Meller

Charts

Weekly charts

Year-end charts

Singles

Certifications

See also
Steal This Book

References

System of a Down albums
2002 albums
Hard rock albums by American artists
Columbia Records albums
Albums produced by Rick Rubin
American Recordings (record label) albums
Albums produced by Daron Malakian